In Argentina, for most of the history of broadcasting, there were only five major commercial national terrestrial networks. Until 2018, these were Televisión Pública, El Nueve, El Trece, Telefe and América. Since 2018, Net TV became the sixth major commercial network, with Televisión Pública being the national public television service. Local media markets have their own television stations, which may either be affiliated with or owned and operated by a television network. Stations may sign affiliation agreements with one of the national networks for the local rights to carry their programming.

Transition to digital broadcasting began in 2009, when the Secretary of Communications recommended the adoption of the ISDB-T standard for digital television, with the "Argentine Digital Terrestrial Television System" being created. Digital television has reached 80 percent of Argentina as of December 2013. The country was expected to end all analogue broadcasts in 2019, but the date was later delayed to August 31, 2021.

As of 2019, household ownership of television sets in the country is 99%, with the majority of households usually having two sets.

Major broadcast networks

National over-the-air commercial television networks
The following are the television networks with a presence throughout the national territory, via the "Televisión Digital Abierta" service (Open Digital Television in English).

Over-the-air stations by area

Greater Buenos Aires
Operating since April 21, 2010 from the Ministry of Public Works Building in Buenos Aires, since October 1, 2010 from La Plata and Luján, since March 29, 2012 from Villa Martelli and since April 4, 2012 from San Justo.

Buenos Aires Province

Mar del Plata 
Operating since February 1, 2011 from Mar del Plata.

Trenque Lauquen 
Operating since August 16, 2012 from Trenque Lauquen.

Chaco

Greater Resistencia 
Operating since September 1, 2010 from Puerto Tirol.

Presidencia Roque Sáenz Peña 
Operating since February 18, 2018 from Presidencia Roque Sáenz Peña.

Chubut

Comodoro Rivadavia 
Operating since April 15, 2013 from Comodoro Rivadavia.

Córdoba

Greater Córdoba 
Operating since January 1, 2011 from Cerro Mogote and since February 14, 2012 from Córdoba.

Río Cuarto 
Operating since February 14, 2012 from Río Cuarto.

Villa María 
Operating since May 1, 2011 from Villa María.

Corrientes

Greater Corrientes 
Operating from Corrientes. Also available in Greater Resistencia.

Entre Ríos

Paraná 
Operating since June 1, 2011 from Paraná.

Formosa

Clorinda–Laguna Blanca 
Operating since February 8, 2013 from Clorinda and since January 29, 2014 from Laguna Blanca.

Formosa 
Operating since December 1, 2010 from Formosa.

Jujuy

San Salvador de Jujuy 
Operating since May 1, 2011 from San Salvador de Jujuy.

La Pampa

Santa Rosa 
Operating since October 6, 2011 from Santa Rosa.

La Rioja

La Rioja 
Operating since February 1, 2011 from La Rioja.

Mendoza

Greater Mendoza 
Operating since December 19, 2011 from Mendoza.

Misiones

Posadas 
Operating since June 1, 2011 from Posadas.

Río Negro

San Carlos de Bariloche 
Operating since March 1, 2011 from Bariloche.

Salta

Salta 
Operating since November 25, 2011 from Salta.

San Juan

San Juan 
Operating since February 1, 2011 from San Juan and since December 12, 2012 from San José de Jáchal.

San Luis

San Luis 
Operating since December 14, 2011 from San Luis.

Santa Fe

Greater Santa Fe 
Operating since October 6, 2011 from Santo Tomé.

Greater Rosario 
Operating since October 6, 2011 from Rosario.

Notes

See also 
 Television in Argentina
 Television in Latin America

References

External links
 Map of antennas and stations by area (provided by ARSAT).

Television in Argentina
Mass media in Argentina